The house at 262–264 Pelham Street in Methuen, Massachusetts is a rare Georgian Revival two-family house in a rural-suburban setting.  The two-story house was built in 1920, and is a roughly square center entry plan with a wraparound porch supported by fourteen rusticated Ionic columns.  It has a hipped roof, and is built of concrete and cast stone, building materials that are uncommon in Methuen.  The windows and corners are highlighted by quoining with darker colored stones.

The house was listed on the National Register of Historic Places in 1984.

See also
 National Register of Historic Places listings in Methuen, Massachusetts
 National Register of Historic Places listings in Essex County, Massachusetts

References

Houses in Methuen, Massachusetts
National Register of Historic Places in Methuen, Massachusetts
Houses on the National Register of Historic Places in Essex County, Massachusetts
Houses completed in 1920
1920 establishments in Massachusetts